Hillaryville is an unincorporated community in Ascension Parish, Louisiana, United States.

The small community is traced back to the late 1800s. It is home to Word of Life Christian Center, which was founded by Nationally renowned evangelist, Apostle Leroy Thompson.

References

Unincorporated communities in Ascension Parish, Louisiana
Unincorporated communities in Louisiana